Gazo  may refer to:

People
Gazo (rapper) (born 1994), French rapper
Gazo Chinard (1230–1294), Italian noble lord
Eddie Gazo (born 1950), Nicaraguan boxer 
Francesco Gazo (born 1992), Italian footballer

Other uses
Gazu (also known as Gazo), a village in Khash County, Sistan and Baluchestan Province, Iran
Beth Gazo (literary the house of treasure), a Syriac liturgical book that contains a collection of Syriac chants and melodies

See also
Gaso (disambiguation)
GazoPa, a former image search engine